Yupanquia is a genus of South American tangled nest spiders containing the single species, Yupanquia schiapelliae. It was  first described by Pekka T. Lehtinen in 1967, and has only been found in Argentina.

References

Amaurobiidae
Monotypic Araneomorphae genera
Spiders of Argentina
Taxa named by Pekka T. Lehtinen